The Cuatro y Medio Euskadi Championship is an individual championship of Basque pelota, often known as The Cage due to the front-on setup.
Cuatro y Medio means Four and a half. The rules state that every ball that rebounds too far from that particular mark is considered pasa (fail). This makes it a game of precision, more than one of power.

Championships

Pelotaris 

Basque pelota competitions